Tiberiu Gabriel Șerban (born 24 October 1977) is a Romanian former footballer who played as a midfielder.

Conviction
After ending his playing career in 2010, Șerban suffered from alcoholism and epilepsy, having divorced his wife. In 2017 he was sentenced to one year and three months in prison after threatening his girlfriend with a knife in a bar, he was released from prison after a few months.

Honours
Ceahlăul Piatra Neamț
Divizia B: 2005–06

References

1977 births
Living people
Romanian footballers
Association football midfielders
Liga I players
Liga II players
Liga III players
CSM Ceahlăul Piatra Neamț players
CF Liberty Oradea players
FC Petrolul Ploiești players
ASC Daco-Getica București players
Sportspeople from Piatra Neamț
Romanian prisoners and detainees
Prisoners and detainees of Romania